The Oberliga West was the highest level of the German football league system in the west of Germany from 1947 until the formation of the Bundesliga in 1963. It covered the state of North Rhine-Westphalia, the most populous state of Germany.

Overview

The league was created in 1947 as the highest level of football in the newly created state of North Rhine-Westphalia, then part of the British occupation zone. It replaced the various Gauligas, which had existed until 1945 in the region:
 Gauliga Köln-Aachen
 Gauliga Moselland
 Gauliga Niederrhein
 Gauliga Westfalen

The league was, together with the Oberliga Nord, the last of the five Oberligas to be formed, the other four being:

Oberliga Nord (formed in 1947)
Oberliga Berlin (formed in 1945, originally with clubs from West and East Berlin)
Oberliga Südwest (formed in 1945)
Oberliga Süd (formed in 1945)

The Oberliga West was formed from thirteen clubs from the Landesligas Niederrhein, Mittelrhein and Westfalen. The Landesligas remained the second tier of football in the West until 1949, when the 2. Oberliga West was formed.

With the reintroduction of the German championship in 1948, the winner and runners-up of the Oberliga West went on to the finals tournament with the other Oberliga champions. The Oberliga West, together with the Oberliga Süd, were the strongest of the five Oberligas, winning six German titles each in the Oberliga period from 1948 to 1963.

Founding members of the Oberliga West
Borussia Dortmund
Sportfreunde Katernberg
STV Horst-Emscher
Hamborn 07
Rot-Weiß Oberhausen
FC Schalke 04
Fortuna Düsseldorf
SpVgg Erkenschwick
Alemannia Aachen
TSG Vohwinkel (merged to become Wuppertaler SV)
Preußen Dellbrück (merged to become Viktoria Köln)
VfR Köln (merged to become Viktoria Köln)
VfL Witten

Disbanding of the Oberliga
With the introduction of the Bundesliga, five teams from the Oberliga West were admitted to the new Bundesliga. The remaining clubs went to the new Regionalliga West, one of five new second divisions.

The teams admitted to the Bundesliga were:
1. FC Köln
Borussia Dortmund
Meidericher SV
SC Preußen Münster
FC Schalke 04

The following teams from the Oberliga went to the new Regionalliga:
Alemannia Aachen
Schwarz-Weiß Essen
Viktoria Köln
Bayer Leverkusen
Rot-Weiß Oberhausen
Borussia Mönchengladbach
Hamborn 07
Fortuna Düsseldorf
Westfalia Herne
Wuppertaler SV
TSV Marl-Hüls

Qualifying for the Bundesliga
The qualifying system for the new league was fairly complex. The league placings of the clubs playing in the Oberligen for the last ten seasons were taken into consideration, whereby results from 1952 to 1955 counted once, results from 1955 to 1959 counted double and results from 1959 to 1963 triple. A first-place finish was awarded 16 points, a sixteenth place one point. Appearances in the German championship or DFB-Pokal finals were also rewarded with points. The five Oberliga champions of the 1962-63 season were granted direct access to the Bundesliga. All up, 46 clubs applied for the 16 available Bundesliga slots.

Following this system, by 11 January 1963, the DFB announced nine fixed clubs for the new league and reduced the clubs eligible for the remaining seven places to 20. Clubs within the same Oberliga that were separated by less than 50 points were considered on equal rank and the 1962-63 placing was used to determine the qualified team.

All Oberliga West clubs except TSV Marl-Hüls applied for Bundesliga membership. Borussia Dortmund, 1. FC Köln and FC Schalke 04 qualified early. Meidericher SV and Preußen Münster qualified even though both clubs had less points than Alemannia Aachen. Aachen finished fifth, Meidericher SV came in fourth and Preußen Münster earned a third-place finish in 1962–63.

Points table:

 
 Bold Denotes club qualified for the new Bundesliga.
 1 Denotes club was one of the nine selected on 11 January 1963.
 2 Denotes club was one of the 20 taken into final selection.
 3 Denotes club was one of the 15 applicants which were removed from final selection.
 4 Denotes club withdrew Bundesliga application.

Honours
The winners and runners-up of the Oberliga West:

 Bold denotes team went on to win German championship.

Placings & all-time table of the Oberliga West 
The final placings and all-time table of the Oberliga West:

Table includes results from the finals rounds of the German Championship.
Preussen Dellbrück merged with SC Rapid Köln in 1957 to form Viktoria Köln. SC Rapid Köln itself was a merger club, incorporating VfR Köln.
SSV Wuppertal and TSG Vohwinkel merged in 1954 to form Wuppertaler SV.

References

Sources
 Kicker Almanach,  The yearbook on German football from Bundesliga to Oberliga, since 1937, published by the Kicker Sports Magazine
 Die Deutsche Liga-Chronik 1945-2005  History of German football from 1945 to 2005 in tables, publisher: DSFS, published: 2006

External links
 Das deutsche Fussball Archiv  Historic German league tables
 Oberliga West at Fussballdaten.de

Wes
Football competitions in North Rhine-Westphalia
1947 establishments in Germany
1963 disestablishments in Germany
Sports leagues established in 1947
Ger